Robinson Devor is an American film director, screenwriter and editor. He is also a film professor at Cornish College of the Arts.

Devor has directed both documentaries as well as fiction films; his filmography includes narrative works such as The Woman Chaser (1999) and Police Beat (2005), and his documentary work includes Zoo (2007), and Pow Wow (2018).

Early life 
Devor was raised in Westchester County in New York. After attaining his BFA in Film from SMU, Devor moved to Los Angeles, where he became a regular attendee at the New Beverly Cinema . He considered becoming a poet and applied to study under James Dickey at the University of South Carolina, but an unexpected job offer in Africa diverted him for a year. During that time he made enough money to edit the footage of his first documentary Angelyne (1995).

Career

Angelyne (1995)
Devor's first short documentary Angelyne was a half-hour, black and white 16mm film co-directed by Michael Guccioni. Devor met Guccioni at a weekly avant-garde film night in Los Angeles, where the two chose to work on a collaborative project as co-directors. Angelyne captured a day in the life of the self-made LA billboard queen, Angelyne. The film premiered at the New York Underground Film Festival, where The Village Voice called it “a visual knockout”.

The Woman Chaser (1999) 

Devor's first feature film, The Woman Chaser,  debuted at the 1999 New York Film Festival and then at Sundance. Devor had acquired the rights to the 1960 Charles Willeford novel and adapted the book into a screenplay. The story centers around a used car salesman who decides to become a film director. The film received critical high marks throughout its US theatrical run and became a cult classic.

THE WOMAN CHASER was released on VHS in Stereo in its black-and-white version in 2000 by 'Tribe Enterprises/The GLOBAL Asylum'.

Police Beat (2005) 
Devor's second feature film, Police Beat, was nominated for the Grand Prize at the 2005 Sundance Film Festival. The film was a loose adaptation of Charles Mudede’s weekly column, Police Beat, and focused on a Muslim-African born lovesick bike cop in Seattle. It was named one of the year's best films by Film Comment and Art Forum. It has been included in the permanent collection of the Museum of Modern Art.

Zoo (2007) 

Devor's next documentary, Zoo, also a collaboration with Mudede, made its world premiere at the 2007 Sundance Film Festival, and then went on to play at the Cannes Film Festival in the Director's Fortnight Section. The film was based on a true story about a Seattle engineer who died while having sex with a horse. The film was named as "one of the Best 15 Documentaries of the 2000s" by Taste of Cinema.

Pow Wow (2018) 
Devor ‘s 2018 feature documentary Pow Wow: An Anthropological Study of the Members of the Indian Desert Country Club, a collaboration with writer Michael McConville, debuted at the Locarno Film Festival and then in the US at Lincoln Center (Art of the Real). It was named one of the best films of the year by Richard Brody of The New Yorker.

Future projects 
Devor is currently in post-production on the feature film You Can't Win, starring Michael Pitt.

He's also in production on a documentary about Sarah Jane Moore, the woman who attempted to assassinate President Gerald Ford in 1975.

Devor is entering pre-production on an adaptation of Kenneth Patchen’s novel The Journal of Albion Moonlight. The plot centers on a New York City shoe salesman who drives to Nebraska to stand by the victim of a hate crime that may or may not have happened.

Devor recently collaborated with writer Patrick Radoci on a TV pilot called Coup d’Etat: How I Was Part of the Problem and Became a Problem For The Problem. The satirical dark comedy is about a history professor at a Northwest university who leads his students down the path of violent revolution.

References
        3.  Brody, Richard. “One Must-See New Movie, and Two Older Ones, That Expand Documentary Filmmaking.” The New Yorker, www.newyorker.com/culture/richard-brody/one-must-see-new-movie-and-two-older-ones-that-expand-documentary-filmmaking.

4. Petrillo, Zac. “The 15 Best Documentaries of The 2000s.” Taste of Cinema - Movie Reviews and Classic Movie Lists, 24 Oct. 2014, www.tasteofcinema.com/2014/the-15-best-documentaries-of-the-2000s/.

External links
 

American documentary film directors
American film editors
Living people
Place of birth unknown
Year of birth unknown
People from Westchester County, New York
Film directors from New York (state)
Southern Methodist University alumni
Cornish College of the Arts faculty
Year of birth missing (living people)